Canton of Marseille-Les Grands-Carmes is a former canton located within the commune of Marseille in the Bouches-du-Rhône department of France. It was created 27 February 2003 by the decree 2003-156 of that date. It was disbanded following the French canton reorganisation which came into effect in March 2015. Its population was 29,292 in 2012.

Elected to represent the canton in the General Council of Bouches-du-Rhône'' : 
 Jean-Noël Guérini  (PS, 2001-2008)

Area
It is composed of the part of the 1st arrondissement of Marseille  situated north of the streets rue Colbert and rue Nationale until the border with the Canton of Marseille-Les Cinq-Avenues and the 2nd arrondissement of Marseille.

See also 
 Arrondissement of Marseille
 Cantons of the Bouches-du-Rhône department
 Communes of the Bouches-du-Rhône department

References

Former cantons of Marseille
Marseille-Les Grands-Carmes
2015 disestablishments in France
States and territories disestablished in 2015
2003 establishments in France